The 1966 BRSCC British Saloon Car Championship was the ninth season of the series. Group 5 regulations were introduced to the championship this year. The title was won by John Fitzpatrick in a class A Ford Anglia.

Calendar & Winners
All races were held in the United Kingdom. Overall winners in bold.

Championship results

References

British Touring Car Championship seasons
Saloon